= Orthodox liturgical calendar =

Orthodox liturgical calendar may refer to:

- Eastern Orthodox liturgical calendar
- Hebrew calendar used in Orthodox Jewish liturgy
